CSM Oradea is a Romanian sports society from Oradea, Romania, founded in 2003.

Men's Basketball section 
During the last few years, CSM Oradea became one of the most powerful teams in Romanian basketball. The Red Lions have won the championship three times, and have played several other finals. In the 2016/17 season, they played in the Basketball Champions League group stages and the FIBA Europe Cup quarter-finals.

External links 
Official website 

Sports clubs established in 2003
Multi-sport clubs in Romania
Sport in Oradea
CSM Oradea